James Hanson (born 15 September 1988) is an Australian rugby union player for playing as a hooker. He recently played for English Premiership Rugby side Gloucester

Early life
Hanson was born in Brisbane. He played schoolboy rugby at Gregory Terrace and was selected for the Australian Schools team in 2005.

Hanson played his first senior rugby with the University club and was selected for the Australia Under 19 rugby team in 2006 and 2007.

Career
Hanson played in the Australian Rugby Championship for the Melbourne Rebels in 2007. He signed a development contract with the Queensland Reds, and made his Super Rugby debut for the Reds in 2009. He played off the bench in Queensland's win over the Crusaders in the Super Rugby final of 2011, and went on to play seven seasons at the Reds.

Hanson made his Wallabies debut at Suncorp Stadium Brisbane, Queensland on 20 October 2012. The end result was an 18–18 draw with the All-Blacks in the final Bledisloe Cup match of the season.

Hanson signed with the Rebels in 2016 to play Super Rugby in Melbourne.

Hanson signed a short-term deal with English club Gloucester in the Aviva Premiership until the end of the year 2017, with an initial plan to rejoin the Rebels. However, on 13 December 2017, it was announced that Hanson had signed a permanent deal to stay at Gloucester following agreement by the Melbourne Rebels to release him early from his contract. He was granted early release from Gloucester in February 2021.

Hanson has signed a 1-year contract back at the Melbourne Rebels for the 2021 Super Rugby AU season.

Super Rugby statistics

References

External links
 

1988 births
Australian rugby union players
Australia international rugby union players
Queensland Reds players
Brisbane City (rugby union) players
Sydney Stars players
Melbourne Rebels players
Rugby union hookers
Living people
Rugby union players from Brisbane
Barbarian F.C. players
Gloucester Rugby players
Expatriate rugby union players in England
Australian expatriate rugby union players
North Harbour rugby union players
Expatriate rugby union players in New Zealand
Melbourne Rising players